Rulison is an unincorporated community in Garfield County, Colorado, United States. It is most notable for being the location of the Project Rulison nuclear test on September 10, 1969. The town of Parachute, Colorado is nearby, and Rulison is accessible from Interstate 70/U.S. Route 6.

See also

References

External links

Populated places in Garfield County, Colorado
Unincorporated communities in Colorado